Sadaa Mee Sevalo is a 2005 Telugu movie directed by G. Neelakanta Reddy starring Venu Thottempudi and Shriya Saran.

Plot
Tilak is a mind games expert and tries to help people in need. He and his friend, who is a lawyer, and a former police officer help needy people who are in the public. Tilak falls in love with Suryakantham. He follows her and they both fall in love. Suryakantham has difficulty adjusting to help people in need. Suryakantham gets kidnapped by Tilak's enemies. Tilak saves her.

Cast
 Venu Thottempudi as Tilak
 Shriya Saran as Suryakantham
 Sunil
 Mallikarjuna Rao
 Tanikella Bharani as Kanaka Rao, Suryakantham's father
 Apoorva as Suryakantham's mother
 Ananth Babu as Tenant with two wives
 Subbaraju as MLA Ravinder Babu
 Telangana Shakuntala as mother to Boggula Mallesh, goon under MLA
Nutan Prasad
 Rajitha
Vijayachander

Soundtrack
The music was composed by Vandemataram Srinivas and released by Aditya Music.

References

External links
 

2000s Telugu-language films
2005 films